Preston Lee Hanna (born September 10, 1954) is a former Major League Baseball pitcher. He played all or parts of eight seasons in the major leagues from 1975 until 1982. He was drafted by the Atlanta Braves in the first round of the 1972 Major League Baseball Draft, 11th overall, and stayed with their organization until his release in July 1982. He played the rest of that season with the Oakland Athletics to finish his career.

Sources

Baseball Gauge
Retrosheet
Venezuelan Professional Baseball League

1954 births
Living people
Atlanta Braves players
Baseball players from Florida
Greenwood Braves players
Leones del Caracas players
American expatriate baseball players in Venezuela
Major League Baseball pitchers
Oakland Athletics players
Portland Beavers players
Richmond Braves players
Savannah Braves players
Tacoma Tigers players
Tigres de Aragua players
Wytheville Braves players